Mowmenabad (also Romanized as Mow’menābād; also known as Akbarābād and Mo’menābād) is a village in Pasakuh Rural District, Zavin District, Kalat County, Razavi Khorasan Province, Iran. At the 2006 census, its population was 156, in 37 families.

References 

Populated places in Kalat County